The National Democratic and Federal Convention is a political party in Chad. 
According to IPU Parline, the party won 1 out of 155 seats in the 2002 Chadian parliamentary election. The party leader is Ali Golhor.

Political parties in Chad